Chandler Unified School District serves most of the city of Chandler, Arizona, plus portions of Gilbert, and Queen Creek. The district serves over 45,000 students, making it the 3rd largest school district in Arizona. 

Some parts of Chandler are not part of this school district. All of Chandler west of the Loop 101 freeway is part of the Kyrene School District and Tempe Union High School District; some parts of Chandler near the Mesa border are served by that city's school district.

Number of Schools
 32 elementary schools
 Ten junior high schools
 Eight comprehensive high schools
 Four alternative schools
 Two Gifted Academies (Knox and Weinberg Elementary School)
 Arizona College Prep (a preparatory junior high and high school)
 Five Chandler Traditional Academies (four elementary schools and a junior high school)
 Four hybrid schools (Traditional and Classic on the same campus)

High schools

Junior high schools

Elementary schools

Alternative Education Programs

See also

References

External links
 

School districts in Maricopa County, Arizona

1900 establishments in Arizona Territory
School districts established in 1900